Stonewall County Airport  is a public airport in Aspermont, Stonewall County, Texas, United States, located  northeast of the central business district. The airport has no IATA or ICAO designation. 

The airport is owned by Stonewall County and is used solely for general aviation purposes.

Facilities 
 Runway 17/35: 4,000 x 60 ft. (1,219 x 18 m), Surface: Asphalt

For the 12-month period ending 26 May 2015, the airport had 400 aircraft operations, an average of 33 per month: 100% general aviation. At that time there were no aircraft based at this airport.

References

External links 
  at Texas DOT Airport Directory

Airports in Texas
Transportation in Stonewall County, Texas